The 2003 New Zealand Television Awards was staged on Friday 22 August 2003 in Auckland, New Zealand. Honouring excellence in New Zealand television for the previous year, the awards ceremony was hosted by TV presenter Jason Gunn and was sponsored by the newly established government agency New Zealand Trade and Enterprise. Highlights of the event were later broadcast on TV ONE. This was to be the final awards organised by the New Zealand Academy of Film and Television Arts. No awards were held in 2004, with the New Zealand Television Broadcasters Council organising the new Qantas Television Awards in 2005.

Winners

Awards in 36 categories were given, including two people's choice awards – Best New Programme and Best Presenter.

Best Documentary
No Mean Feat, Chas Toogood (Chas Toogood Productions)

Best Episode of a Drama Series or Serial	
Street Legal, Chris Hampson (ScreenWorks)

Best Drama Series or Serial
Street Legal, Chris Hampson (ScreenWorks)

Best Entertainment Programme 
Westfield Style Pasifika, Julie Smith and Stan Wolfgramm (Drum Productions)

Best Entertainment Series
Mo Show, Mo Show – Iain Eggleton (XSTV)

Best Documentary Series 
2050 What if... New Zealand Becomes a State of Australia?, Dan Salmon, Bruce Morrison, Cass Avery & Jude Callen (Screentime Communicado)

Best Factual Series 
Queer Nation, Andrew Whiteside (Livingstone Productions)

Best Lifestyle Series
The Living Room, Sticky Pictures

Best Comedy Programme
Spin Doctors, series 3, Tony Holden (Comedia Pictures)

Best Sports Programme
Shell Helix Motorsport – NZ V8 Round, David Turner (TVNZ Sports)

Best Mäori Programme
Syd Jackson – Life & Times of a Maori Activist, Toby Mills & Moana Maniapoto (Tawera Productions & Black Pearl Productions)

Best Mäori Language Programme
Sciascia, (Maui Productions)

Best New Programme (People's Choice)
The Strip, series 1, Dave Gibson (Gibson Group)

Best Actress
Street Legal, Katherine Kennard (ScreenWorks)

Best Actor
Mercy Peak, Jeffrey Thomas (South Pacific Pictures)

Best Supporting Actress
Mercy Peak, Alison Bruce (South Pacific Pictures)

Best Supporting Actor
Street Legal, Charles Mesure (ScreenWorks)

Best Juvenile Actor/Actress
The Strip, series 1, Renee Elwood (Gibson Group)

Best Entertainment/Comedy Performance
Spin Doctors, series 3, Elizabeth Hawthorne (Comedia Pictures)

Best Presenter (People's Choice)
3 News, John Campbell (TV3)

Best Script, Single Episode of a Drama Series or Serial 
The Strip, series 1, Paula Boock & Kathryn Burnett (Gibson Group)

Best Script, Comedy
Spin Doctors, series 3	, Roger Hall, James Griffin, Dave Armstrong (Comedia Pictures)

Best Narration Script, Non-Drama
The Lost Dinosaurs of New Zealand, Bryan Bruce & Ian Johnstone (Red Sky Film & Television)

Best Director, Drama
Mataku, Peter Burger (South Pacific Pictures)

Best Director, Documentary
2050 What if... Mäori Gain Sovereignty – Tino Rangitiratanga?, Dan Salmon (Screentime Communicado)

Best Director, Factual/Entertainment Programme 
The Living Room, Mark Albiston (Sticky Pictures)

Best Camera, Drama
Street Legal, Fred Renata (ScreenWorks)

Best Camera, Non-Drama
Mercury Lane, series 1, Rewa Harre (Greenstone Pictures)

Best Editing, Drama
Mataku, Allannah Milne (South Pacific Pictures)

Best Editing, Non-Drama
2050 What if... New Zealand Becomes a State of Australia?, Bryan Shaw (Screentime Communicado)

Best Original Music	
Street Legal, Don McGlashan (ScreenWorks)

Best Contribution to a Soundtrack
Mataku, Lloyd Canham & Nick Buckton (South Pacific Pictures)

Best Production Design
Mataku, Miro Harre (South Pacific Pictures)

Best Costume Design
The Dress Up Box, Karol London (Papageno Productions)

Best Contribution to Design
Willy Nilly, Catriona Campbell (Big House)

Lifetime Achievement Award in Broadcasting
Marcia Russell

References

External links
KiwiTV – 2003 New Zealand Television Awards

New Zealand television awards
Television awards
New Zealand
Awards
2000s in New Zealand cinema